The Pimlico Spring Handicap was a race for Thoroughbred horses run annually from 1917 through 1932 at Pimlico Race Course racetrack in Baltimore, Maryland. The mile and one-sixteenth race on dirt was open to horses of either sex age three and older.

Historic notes
For most of its duration, the event attracted top-level horses such as inaugural winner Pennant, the 1913 Belmont Futurity winner and sire of U.S. Racing Hall of Fame inductee, Equipoise. Others include 1918 winner Cudgel, who beat that year's American Champion Older Male Horse, Omar Khayyam. In 1921 Sandy Beal won the Pimlico Spring Handicap beating 1920 Kentucky Derby winner Paul Jones, and 1922 winner Exterminator had already won a Kentucky Derby and by the time he retired from racing had been named a five-time Champion as well as a U.S. Racing Hall of Fame inductee.

The Pimlico Spring Handicap was a victim of the Great Depression in the United States which brought much consolidation of races at every track and a dramatic reduction in purse money.

Records
Speed record: (at 1 1/16 miles)
 1:45 0/0 - Edisto (1926)

Most wins by a jockey:
 2 - Fred Stevens (1924, 1930)

Most wins by a trainer:
 2 - H. Guy Bedwell (1918, 1920)

Most wins by an owner:
 2 - Harry Payne Whitney (1917, 1923)
 2 - J. K. L. Ross (1918, 1920)

Winners

References

Discontinued horse races
Horse races in Maryland
Pimlico Race Course
Recurring sporting events established in 1917
Recurring sporting events disestablished in 1932